The John Mertz House at 610 W. Washington St. in Sandusky, Ohio was built in 1909.  It was designed and/or built by George Feick.  It was listed on the National Register of Historic Places in 1992.

The connection from the Feick family was by marriage of John Mertz to Ida Elizabeth Feick, who was born in Sandusky in 1863 to Adam Feick.

References

Houses on the National Register of Historic Places in Ohio
Neoclassical architecture in Ohio
Houses completed in 1909
Houses in Erie County, Ohio
National Register of Historic Places in Erie County, Ohio